Tadoule Lake Airport  is located  southwest of Tadoule Lake, Manitoba, Canada.

Airlines and destinations

References

External links

Certified airports in Manitoba